Love Khichdi is an Indian Hindi romantic comedy film, directed by Srinivas Bhashyam The film was released on 28 August 2009.

Plot
Veer is a bachelor from a small town working as a sous-chef in a five-star hotel in Mumbai, India. He is handsome, charming and easy-going and flirts with and lusts after any woman. With his ego, confusion and commitment issues, it is impossible for him to stop lying. The sometimes smart and sometimes silly observations of his all-male gang of coworkers at the hotel kitchen are of little help until Veer is finally forced to grow up.

Cast
Randeep Hooda - Veer Pratap Singh
Sadha - Sandhya Iyengar
Rituparna Sengupta - Sharmishta Basu
Divya Dutta - Parminder Kaur
Riya Sen - Deepti Jignesh Mehta
Sonali Kulkarni - Shanta Bheemrao Bhansode
Kalpana Pandit - Nafisa Khan
Jesse Randhawa - Susan Raj
Saurabh Shukla - Krishnan/Guruji
Sanjay Mishra - Tambe
Mukesh Bhatt - Nandu
Ujjwal Chopra - Vikas Sharma
Milind Soman - Subramani Iyer

Soundtrack

References

Further reading

External links

2009 films
Films featuring songs by Pritam
2000s Hindi-language films
Cooking films
Films about food and drink
Fox Star Studios films